Songs for the Mama That Tried is the 32nd studio album by American country singer Merle Haggard with backing by The Strangers, released in 1981. A Gospel album, it reached Number 46 on the Billboard country albums chart.

Background
Songs for the Mama That Tried was Haggard's last principal release on MCA, having signed with Epic Records. The title alludes to Haggard's 1968 song "Mama Tried", a song which became a cornerstone of his career. Haggard had recorded a live gospel album in 1971 called The Land of Many Churches but this set is dedicated to his mother Flossie, who was seventy-nine years old when she posed with Haggard on the cover of the LP.  Produced by Haggard, the album features background harmonies from both his second wife Bonnie Owens and his then current wife Leona Williams.

The album yielded no hit singles and was not a big seller.  In his 1999 memoir My House of Memories Haggard writes, "I love those songs as much as Mom did.  I can't describe the comfort they've given me.  I haven't listened to that album in years."

Reception

Writing in the 2013 book The Running Kind, Haggard biographer David Cantwell calls the album "perfect," praising the singer's "reverent, soulful singing."

The album received five stars in the second edition of the Rolling Stone Record Guide.

Track listing 
"When God Comes and Gathers His Jewels" (Hank Williams)
"Suppertime" (Ira P. Stanphill)
"He Walks with Me (In the Garden)" (C. Austin Miles, Robert Hebble)
"Softly and Tenderly" (Will L. Thompson)
"Why Me" (Kris Kristofferson)
"Where No One Stands Alone" (Mosie Lister)
"One Day at a Time" (Kristofferson, Marijohn Wilkin)
"What a Friend We Have in Jesus" (Joseph M. Scriven, Charles Crozat Converse, Sid Feller)
"Swing Low, Sweet Chariot" (Traditional)
"The Old Rugged Cross" (George Bennard)
"Keep on the Sunny Side" (A. P. Carter)

Personnel
Merle Haggard– vocals, guitar

The Strangers:
Roy Nichols - lead guitar
Norman Hamlet - steel guitar
 Gordon Terry - fiddle
Ronnie Reno - rhythm guitar
Mark Yeary - piano
Dennis Hromek - bass
Biff Adams - drums
Don Markham - saxophone, trumpet

with:
Bonnie Owens – backing vocals
Leona Williams - backing vocals

and:
Kemo Kemolian - fiddle, guitar

Chart performance

References

1981 albums
Merle Haggard albums
MCA Records albums